Gjashtë is a village in the municipality of Sarandë, Vlorë County, southwestern Albania.

Name
The name of the village comes from the Albanian Gjashtë meaning Six.

Sources

Populated places in Sarandë
Villages in Vlorë County